The BEACON Center for the Study of Evolution in Action is a science and technology center in the United States, focused on experimental and applied research on evolutionary dynamics,  sponsored by the National Science Foundation.  The consortium of universities that make up BEACON is led by Michigan State University with partner institutions of North Carolina A&T State University, the University of Idaho, the University of Texas at Austin, and the University of Washington.

BEACON stands for Bio/computational Evolution in Action CONsortium. BEACON's mission is illuminating and harnessing the power of evolution in action to advance science and technology and benefit society. Members of the center conduct research on evolution in both biological and digital realms, and also use evolutionary computing for engineering applications.  At latest count in 2016, BEACON had 583 members, including faculty, postdoctoral researchers, graduate and undergraduate students.

The director of the center is Charles Ofria.  The other principal investigators are Erik D. Goodman, Richard Lenski, Robert T. Pennock, and Kay Holekamp.

References

External links
 BEACON Center for the Study of Evolution in Action

Science and technology in the United States